Oryctopleura is a monotypic snout moth genus. Its only species, Oryctopleura arcuatalis, was described by Émile Louis Ragonot in 1891. It is found in Brazil.

References

Moths described in 1891
Chrysauginae
Monotypic moth genera
Moths of South America
Pyralidae genera
Taxa named by Émile Louis Ragonot